David Kearney may refer to:

 David Kearney (archbishop) (died 1624), Irish Roman Catholic prelate
 Dave Kearney (born 1989), Irish rugby union player
 David Kearney (Shortland Street), a fictional character on the New Zealand soap opera Shortland Street
 David William Kearney, better known as Guitar Shorty (born 1939), American blues guitarist